In mathematics, the Leimkuhler-Matthews method (or LM method in its original paper ) is an algorithm for finding discretized solutions to the Brownian dynamics

Given a time step , the Leimkuhler-Matthews update scheme is compactly written as

with initial condition , and where . The vector  is a vector of independent normal random numbers redrawn at each step so  (where  denotes expectation).

This means that as  gets large we obtain an effective second order with  error in computed expectations. For small time step  this can give significant improvements over the Euler-Maruyama scheme, at no extra cost.

Discussion

Comparison to other schemes
Its update is of the form 

Compared to the above definition, the only difference between the schemes is the one-step averaged noise term, making it simple to implement.

For sufficiently small time step  and large enough time  it is clear that the LM scheme gives a smaller error than Euler-Maruyama. While there are many algorithms that can give reduced error compared to the Euler scheme (see e.g. Milstein, Runge-Kutta or Heun's method) these almost always come at an efficiency cost, requiring more computation in exchange for reducing the error. However the Leimkuhler-Matthews scheme can give significantly reduced error with minimal change to the standard Euler scheme. The trade-off comes from the (relatively) limited scope of the stochastic differential equation it solves:  must be a scalar constant and the drift function must be of the form . The LM scheme also is not Markovian, as updates require more than just the state at time . However, we can recast the scheme as a Markov process by extending the space.

Markovian Form
Initializing the momentum to be a vector of  standard normal random numbers, we have

where the middle step completely redraws the momentum so that each component is an independent normal random number. This scheme is Markovian, and has the same properties as the original LM scheme.

Applications
The algorithm has application in any area where the weak (i.e. average) properties of solutions to Brownian dynamics are required. This applies to any molecular simulation problem (such as classical molecular dynamics), but also can apply to statistical sampling problems due to the properties of solutions at large times. Thus we can generate independent samples according to a required distribution by using  and running the LM algorithm until large . Such strategies can be efficient in (for instance) Bayesian inference problems.

See also 
 Euler-Maruyama
 Milstein method
 Runge–Kutta method (SDE)
 Heun's method

References

Numerical differential equations 
Stochastic differential equations